This is a list of churches, cathedrals and chapels in Cape Verde.

Boa Vista

Nossa Senhora da Conceição - Povoação Velha
Curral Velho church - reopened around 2010
Espingueira church
Capela de Nossa Senhora de Fátima - north of Sal Rei - abandoned
Rabil church
Sal Rei Nazarene church
Santa Isabel church - Sal Rei1
Capela de Santo António - Povoação Velha
São João Batista church - Fundo das Figueiras1

Brava
Avedomar Estrela church - Furna
Church of Jesus Christ of Latter Day Saints, Brava - one of Cape Verde's first Mormon churches
Cachaço church
Chapel in Mato Grande
Church in Fajã de Água
Nossa Senhora do Monte church, Nossa Senhora do Monte1
Nova Sintra Apostolic church
Nova Sintra Adventist church
Santa Bárbara church - Santa Bárbara
São João Batista church - Nova Sintra1

Fogo
Chã das Caldeiras Adventist church
Church in Fonte Aleixo
Church in Monte Largo
Nossa Senhora da Ajuda church - Mosteiros1
Nossa Senhora da Conceição church/São Filipe Cathedral - São Filipe1
Nossa Senhora de Encarnação church - São Filipe
Nossa Senhora do Socorro church - Vicente Dias
Portela church - Chã das Caldeiras
Church in Salto
Santa Catarina church - Cova Figueira1
Santa Filomena church - São Filipe
São Filipe city Seventh Day Adventist church
São Filipe city Apostolic church
São Filipe city Nazarene church
São Francisco de Assís church - São Filipe
São Lourenco church - São Lourenço1

Maio
Barreiro chapel
Cascabulho church
Figueira da Horta church
Morrinho church
Nossa Senhora da Luz church - Cidade do Maio1
Santa Clara church
Santo Antônio church
São José church - Calheta do Maio
São Pedro church - Pedro Vaz

Sal
Espargos Nazarene church - Espargos
Nossa Senhora das Dores church, - Santa Maria1
Nossa Senhora de Piedade church - Pedra de Lume
Capela de Pedra de Lume
São João church - Espargos
São José church - Palmeira

Santiago
Achada Grande Frente church
Assomada Nazarene church
Chão Bom church
Cidade Velha Adventist church
Hortelão church - Ribeira Principal
Monte Alverne church - Cidade Velha - existed until around 1770
Nossa Senhora da Conceição church - Cidade Velha - existed until around 1770
Nossa Senhora da Fátima church - Assomada
Nossa Senhora da Fátima church - Milho Branco
Nossa Senhora da Luz church - Achada Baleia
Nossa Senhora da Luz church - Milho Branco1
Nossa Senhora do Rosário church - Cidade Velha - the first colonial church and the first church in the sub-Saharan portion of West Africa
Palmarejo Adventist church
Our Lady of Grace Pro-Cathedral - Praia1
Pedra Badejo Apostolic church
Pedra Badejo Baptist church
Pedra Badejo Nazarene church
Pedra Badejo Presbyterian church
Porto Rincão church
Praia Baptist church
Praia Church of Jesus Christ of Latter-Day Saints church
Praia Pentecostal church
Praia Nazarene church
Ribeira da Barca church
Ribeira da Barca Adventist church
Ribeira da Prata church
Rui Vaz church
Sagrado de Coração de Jesus church - Calabaceira, Praia
Santiago Maior church - Pedra Badejo1
Santa Ana church - Santa Ana
Santo Amaro Abade church - Tarrafal1
Santa Casa de Misericórdia church, also a hospital - Cidade Velha - existed until around 1770
Santa Catarina church - Assomada, Achada Falcão1
Santa Luzia chapel - Cidade Velha - existed until around 1770
Capela de Santo António - Achada Santo António, Praia
Achada de Santo António Nazarene church
São Gonçalo church
Convent of Saint Francis (São Francisco) - Cidade Velha
São João Batista church - São João Batista1
São Lourenço dos Órgãos church - João Teves1
São Martinho church - São Martinho Grande
São Miguel Arcanjo church - Calheta de São Miguel1
São Nicolau Tolentino church - São Domingos1
São Pedro church - Cidade Velha - existed until around 1770
São Pedro church - Praia
São Roque church - Cidade Velha - existed until around 1770
São Salvador do Mundo church - Picos1
Capela de São Sebastião - Cidade Velha
Sé Cathedral - Cidade Velha
Tira Chapéu church - Praia
Capela de Trindade - Trindade, Praia
Vila Nova Parish Church - Praia

Santo Antão
Lagoinha chapel
Lombo da Figueira church
Monte Trigo church
Nossa Senhora da Graça church - Pico da Cruz/Cintra da Vaca
Nossa Senhora do Livramento church - Ponta do Sol1
Nossa Senhora do Rosário church - Ribeira Grande1
Santo André church - Ribeira das Pratas1
Santo António church - Pombas1
Santo Crucifixo church - Coculi1
São João Batista church - Porto Novo1
São Pedro church - Figueiral
São Pedro church - Tarrafal de Monte Trigo
São Pedro Apóstolo church - Chã da Igreja1

São Nicolau
Juncalinho church
Nossa Senhora da Lapa church - Queimadas1
Nossa Senhora do Rosário church - Ribeira Brava1
Praia Branca church
Preguiça church
São Francisco de Assis church - Tarrafal de São Nicolau1

São Vicente
Mindelo Nazarene church
Mindelo United Pentecostal church
Mindelo Seventh Day Adventist church
Nossa Senhora da Auxiliadora church - Mindelo
Pro-Cathedral of Our Lady of the Light, Mindelo1
Santa Cruz church - Salamansa
São Pedro church - São Pedro

See also

 List of churches

Notes
1The church also serves as the seat of a parish

References

 
Churches
Cape Verde